Fern "Bunny" Kaley Willits is an American rural sociologist and professor emerita at Pennsylvania State University known for research about rural women and youth. Willits has published over 70 academic papers and 14 books and she is recognised as a "distinguished rural sociologist" by the Rural Sociological Society.

Career 
Willits graduated as valedictorian from Coraopolis High School in Coraopolis, Pennsylvania in 1954. She earned her Bachelor of Science at Penn State in 1958, her Master of Science in 1961, PhD in 1964 under rural sociologist Robert C. Bealer with a dissertation titled An Exploratory Analysis of Individual and Social Level Meanings of Rurality. She has been a professor at the institution since 1964. She has published over 70 academic papers and 14 books, book chapters, and conference proceedings. 

She is known for writing about rural women and youth, as well as rural demographic statistical studies.

Research 
Willits studies public perceptions of social issues and she has engaged in a study of individuals' attitudes over 50 years.  Her study Women in the Rural Sociological Society: A History is cited by the Rural Sociological Society. She has collaborated with the sociologists Carolyn Sachs and Don A. Dillman. Her research has included rural health, family relationships, race, gender, outdoor recreation, the role of religion in rural life, and differing perceptions of rurality/urbanity. Her 1993 article "The Rural Mystique and Tourism Development: Data from Pennsylvania" published in 1993 in which ideas of ideal rurality are assessed indicating that the bucolic ideals are held by low income, elderly, and rural individuals. The article was cited  by Irene Kirkpatrick and Morag Mitchell in their book Rural Tourism and Sustainable Business. Some of Willits'  research includes Pennsylvanians' perceptions of fossil fuels. Her 2009 article "Nonfamily youths temporarily employed in agriculture" was published in the Monthly Labor Review by the Bureau of Statistics.

Awards
In 1988, Willits was given the Award for Excellence in Instruction by the Rural Sociological Society. In 1994, she was awarded the Gamma Sigma Delta Teaching Award. In 1995, she obtained the Penn State Alumni Association Teaching Fellow Award. In 1998,  Willits was given the Award of Distinguished Rural Sociologist by the Rural Sociological Society. In 2019, the Dr. Fern "Bunny" Willits Graduate Award Endowment in Rural Sociology was established by two former statistics students to honor her contributions to the university and to the discipline of rural sociology, providing worthy Penn State candidates with $50,000 financial aid.

Selected publications

References 

Living people
Year of birth missing (living people)
American sociologists
American women sociologists